Preston Blair may refer to:

 Francis Preston Blair, American politician
 Francis Preston Blair, Jr., American general
 Preston Blair, American animator